Waikabubak is a town in East Nusa Tenggara province of Indonesia and it is the capital of West Sumba Regency. Waikabubak is the second largest town on Sumba island after Waingapu; it had a population of 33,064 at the 2020 Census.

Gallery

References

Populated places in East Nusa Tenggara
Geography of Sumba
Regency seats of East Nusa Tenggara